Eji or EJI may refer to:

 Hyeja (died 623), Buddhist priest
 European Journal of Immunology
 Equal Justice Initiative, an American legal-aid organization
 Ethical Journalism Initiative, a global campaign to support quality in media